This is a list of highly notable Muay Thai practitioners (also known as nak muay).

Legend
 Nai Khanomtom (circa 1700s) - a legendary Thai soldier and boxer during the era of the Ayutthaya Kingdom who become known as the founder of Muay Thai. Khanomtom lived during the Second Burmese War (1765–1767). At that time, the Ayutthaya Kingdom was losing its long-running conflict with the Konbaung dynasty. In 1767, the capital of the Ayutthaya Kingdom fell, and Khanomtom was one of the warriors who were captured and sent as a captive to the King of Burma. After seven years of captivity, King Mangra wanted to see how Thai fighters would compare to his fighters. Khanomtom was selected to fight against the King's chosen champion and the boxing ring was set up in front of the throne. When the fight began, Khanomtom charged out, using punches, kicks, elbows and knees to pummel his opponent until he collapsed. The King supposedly asked if Khanomtom would fight nine other Burmese champions to prove himself. He agreed and fought one after the other with no rest periods. His last opponent was a great kickboxing teacher from Rakhine State whom Khanomtom defeated with kicks. The King was so impressed with Khanomtom that he granted Khanomtom his freedom as well as a prize of several wives. Khanomtom would later return to Siam and open his own martial arts school, later giving birth to modern Thai boxing which today is known as Muay Thai.

Muay Thai

Thai

Former 

 Samart Payakaroon - considered by many to be the greatest Muay Thai fighter of all time, becoming Lumpinee stadium champion in four different weight divisions from 1980 to 1981, as well as a WBC world champion in boxing at the Super bantamweight class in 1986. He is the younger brother of Kongtoranee Payakaroon.
Dieselnoi Chor Thanasukarn - was Lumpinee Stadium champion in the lightweight division. In 1982, he defeated Samart Payakaroon via decision. During his four-year reign as champion he was undefeated and was forced to retire as there was nobody in the weight division left to contest his position. He is considered to be the Greatest Muay Khao (knee fighter) of all time.
Vicharnnoi Porntawee - was champion in both the Lumpinee and Rajadamnern stadiums. Faced many strong opponents and holds two victories over Dieselnoi Chor Thanasukarn.
Pudpadnoi Worawut - nicknamed 'The Golden Leg', was one of the most dominant fighters of the 1970s where he won three Lumpinee Stadium titles at three different weight classes.
Apidej Sit-Hirun - was a Lumpinee Stadium champion. He is considered the hardest kicker in Muay Thai history. He was crowned "Fighter of the Century" by Bhumibol Adulyadej, King of Thailand and was the first nak muay to be given his own display at the Thai National Museum.
Kongtoranee Payakaroon - is the older brother of Samart Payakaroon and won the Lumpinee Stadium title in five different weight divisions. He also had a professional boxing career in the Super flyweight division where his record was 12–2 and fought twice for a title. The first time he fought Gilberto Román for the WBC Super flyweight title and the second time he fought against fellow Thai Boxer, Khaosai Galaxy for the WBA Super flyweight title.
Chamuekpet Hapalang - won the Lumpinee Stadium title in four different weight divisions. He is a southpaw stance and best known for his powerful and precise knee strikes which made him received nicknamed "Computer Knee Striker". He also competed as a professional boxer where he was PABA champion at 126 lbs.
Thongchai Tor.Silachai - won the Lumpinee Stadium title in four different weight divisions. In 1996, he became the only person to have knocked out Saenchai in a professional bout.
Namsaknoi Yudthagarngamtorn - won the Lumpinee Stadium title in three different weight divisions. He had one of the longest reigns as champion where he was undefeated in 135 lbs division between 2000–2006.  He holds one of the highest winning percentages (95% wins in 300 fights).
Namkabuan Nongkeepahuyuth - was Lumpinee Stadium champion in the Junior lightweight division. He held the belt for six consecutive years.
Sagat Petchyindee - three time Lumpinee Stadium champion. He is also a professional boxer with a record of 12–2 and fought Wilfredo Gómez in 1978 for the WBC super bantamweight title. He is considered to be the inspiration for the character Sagat in the Street Fighter video game series.
Kaensak Sor.Ploenjit - was Lumpinee Stadium champion in the flyweight division. He fought in the period of the late 80s to early 90s that was considered to be the golden era of Muay Thai where he faced many strong opponents. He was the Muay Thai Fighter of the Year in 1989 and 1990 and is considered one of the most popular fighter of his generation.

Current 

 Saenchai - won the Lumpinee Stadium title in four weight divisions while mostly fighting larger opponents. He has only been knocked out once in his entire fighting career. He is considered by many to be the best pound for pound Muay Thai fighter, and is regarded as one of the best fighters of all time. He is also a professional boxer and was PABA Featherweight interim champion.
 Nong-O Gaiyanghadao - ONE Bantamweight Muay Thai World Champion with four title defenses. Was Lumpinee Stadium champion in four weight divisions.
 Rodtang Jitmuangnon - ONE Flyweight Muay Thai World Champion with three title defenses. Known specifically for his iron chin.
 Sam-A Gaiyanghadao - ONE Champion in both Muay Thai and Kickboxing. Was Lumpinee Stadium champion in two weight divisions.
 Phetmorakot Petchyindee Academy - ONE Featherweight Muay Thai World Champion. Was Lumpinee Stadium champion in two weight divisions.

Non-Thai 

 Ramon Dekkers - Dutch kickboxer who won multiple world titles in Muay Thai. He is considered by many to be the best foreign fighter to fight in Thailand where he faced many strong opponents including Coban Lookchaomaesaitong.
 Toshio Fujiwara - Japanese kickboxer who became the first non-Thai fighter to win a Muay Thai title in Thailand. In 1978 he won the title at the Rajadamnern Stadium in the lightweight division.
 Morad Sari - French-Algerian kickboxer who the first non-Thai fighter to become a Lumpinee Stadium champion. He won the title in 1999 at the lightweight division.
 Damien Alamos - French kickboxer who became Lumpinee Stadium champion in 2012 in the 63.5 kg (140 lbs) division and was the first non-thai fighter to defend it.
 John Wayne Parr - Australian kickboxer who has won multiple world titles in Muay Thai. Was also 2001 Australian Boxing Middleweight Champion.
 Andrei Kulebin - Belarusian kickboxer who has won multiple world titles in Muay Thai at both amateur and professional level.
 Liam Harrison - English Muay Thai fighter who has won multiple world titles.
 Youssef Boughanem - Moroccan-Belgian kickboxer who was champion at both Lumpinee Stadium and Rajadamnern Stadium at the 160 lbs weight division.
Rafi Bohic - French Muay Thai fighter who became Lumpinee Stadium Welterweight Champion in 2017 and has defended the title four times.
Jimmy Vienot - French Muay Thai fighter who was Lumpinee Stadium 160 lbs Champion in 2019.
Andy Howson - Uk Muay Thai fighter WBC,Wako,ISka,WMC world champion;
Jean-Charles Skarbowsky - French Muay Thai fighter who became 3-time European champion.
Dida Diafat - Algerian - French Muay Thai fighter who has won world title in Las Vegas versus Ramon Dekkers.
Nathan Corbett - Australian Muay Thai fighter who has won multiple world title.
Fabio Siciliani - Italian muay thai fighter WAKO world champion.
Dany Bill - Cameroonian former kickboxer and seven-time Muay Thai World Champion.
Alexey Ignashov - Belarus former kickboxer and multiple Muay Thai World Champion.
Mehdi Zatout - ISKA, WMC, WBC Diamond and World Champion.
Sajad Sattari - WBC World Champion.

Boxing 

Khaosai Galaxy - was originally a muay thai fighter where his punching power was noticed. Eventually his manager and trainer convinced him to switch to boxing where they saw more potential. He would become WBA super flyweight champion in boxing with 19 defenses in seven years (1984–1991). With a record of 47–1, he is listed #19 on Ring Magazine's list of 100 greatest punchers of all time and named him the 43rd greatest fighter of the past 80 years in 2002.
Somluck Kamsing - was ranked #1 in the Lumpinee Stadium at the 57 kg (126 lbs) weight division and defeated multiple champions. However promoters never entered him into a title fight. As a result he switched to boxing which offered him a better future. He won Gold in Boxing at the 1996 Summer Olympics in the featherweight division. This made him the first Thai athlete to win Gold at the Olympics.
Dhawee Umponmaha - won the Lumpinee Stadium title in the 57 kg (126 lbs) division. He was one of the few fighters to defeat Dieselnoi Chor Thanasukarn in a professional bout. He later moved to boxing where he was a Silver Medalist in boxing at the 1984 Summer Olympics in the Light welterweight division.
Arkhom Chenglai - won the Lumpinee Stadium title in the 63.5 kg (140 lbs) division. Won a Bronze medal in Boxing at the 1992 Summer Olympics.
Veeraphol Sahaprom - WBC and WBA Bantamweight Champion with 14 title defenses. Was also Rajadamnern Stadium champion in three weight divisions.
Saensak Muangsurin - won the Lumpinee Stadium title in the 63.5 kg (140 lbs) division. He was WBC light welterweight champion, setting a world record by winning a world title in his 3rd professional fight. He is Thailand's heaviest world boxing champion to date.
Yokthai Sithoar - won the Lumpinee Stadium title in the 52 kg (115 lbs) division. Was WBA super flyweight (115 lb) world champion in the late 90s.
Amnat Ruenroeng - won the Lumpinee Stadium title in the Flyweight division.  Held the IBF flyweight title from 2014 to 2016.
Wanheng Menayothin - won the Lumpinee Stadium title in the 48 kg (105 lbs) division. Held the WBC strawweight title from 2014 to 2020.
Knockout CP Freshmart - won the Lumpinee Stadium title in the 48 kg (105 lbs) division. Has held the WBA (Super) minimumweight title since 2016.

Kickboxing

 Buakaw Banchamek - two-time K-1 World MAX champion and two-time runner up as well as a former #1-ranked fighter in Lumpinee Stadium.
Giorgio Petrosyan - 2019 ONE Kickboxing Featherweight World Grand Prix Champion and two-time K-1 World MAX champion.
 Kaew Fairtex - former K-1 Super Lightweight Champion with two title defenses and three time K-1 World GP -65 kg World Tournament Champion. Was Lumpinee Stadium champion in two weight divisions.
 Sitthichai Sitsongpeenong - Glory Lightweight Champion with six title defenses. Was Lumpinee Stadium Welterweight Champion in 2014.
 Petpanomrung Kiatmuu9 - Glory Featherweight Champion with four title defenses.
 Capitan Petchyindee Academy - former ONE Bantamweight Kickboxing World Champion. Was Lumpinee Stadium Super Welterweight Champion in 2019.
 Gonnapar Weerasakreck - former K-1 Lightweight champion and former Krush Lightweight champion with three title defenses.
 Superbon Banchamek - One Featherweight Kickboxing World Champion and currently rated the #1 Pound for pound kickboxer in the world 
 Artem Vakhitov - Two time Glory Light Heavyweight Champion and multiple time gold medalist at the IFMA World Muaythai Championships.
 Artem Levin - Former Glory Middleweight Champion and multiple time gold medalist at the IFMA World Muaythai Championships.
 Marat Grigorian - Former Glory Lightweight Champion
 Harut Grigorian - Former Glory Welterweight Champion

Mixed Martial Arts

The following fighters are primarily known for their use of Muay Thai in MMA bouts.
 Anderson Silva - former UFC Middleweight Champion with the highest number of title defenses (10).
 José Aldo - former UFC Featherweight Champion with the highest number of title defenses (7).
 Valentina Shevchenko - former UFC Women's Flyweight Champion with the highest number of title defenses (7). Multiple time gold medalist at the IFMA World Muaythai Championships.
 Joanna Jędrzejczyk - former UFC Women's Strawweight Champion with the highest number of title defenses (5). Multiple time gold medalist at the IFMA World Muaythai Championships.
 Cris Cyborg - current Bellator Women's Featherweight champion and former UFC Women's Featherweight champion
 Maurício Rua - former UFC Light Heavyweight Champion and 2005 PRIDE Middleweight Grand Prix Champion
 Wanderlei Silva - former PRIDE Middleweight Champion and the 2003 PRIDE Middleweight Grand Prix Tournament Champion
 Alistair Overeem - former Strikeforce Heavyweight champion and winner of the K-1 World Grand Prix 2010 Final.
 Jan Błachowicz - former UFC Light Heavyweight champion.  2008 gold medalist at the IFMA World Muaythai Championships
 Jiří Procházka - former UFC Light Heavyweight champion and former Rizin FC Light Heavyweight champion. 2011 Czech National Champion in Muay Thai
 Ciryl Gane - former interim UFC Heavyweight Champion and undefeated Muay Thai fighter
 Rafael Cordeiro - three time Brazilian national Muay Thai champion, was striking coach at the Chute Boxe Academy and Kings MMA where he trained multiple MMA world champions including Anderson Silva, Cris Cyborg, Maurício Rua and Wanderlei Silva.

Entertainment

 Tony Jaa - Thai martial artist, actor, action choreographer, stuntman, director, traceur and former Buddhist monk.

References

Muay Thai
Muay Thai practitioners
Lists of martial artists